Julie Halard and Nathalie Tauziat were the defending champions but lost in the semifinals to Larisa Neiland and Gabriela Sabatini.

Gigi Fernández and Natasha Zvereva won in the final 7–5, 6–7, 7–5 against Neiland and Sabatini.

Seeds
Champion seeds are indicated in bold text while text in italics indicates the round in which those seeds were eliminated. The top four seeded teams received byes into the second round.

Draw

Final

Top half

Bottom half

External links
 1995 Acura Classic Doubles Draw

LA Women's Tennis Championships
1995 WTA Tour